Kevin Brennan may refer to:
Kevin Brennan (actor) (1920–1998), British actor
Kevin Brennan (politician) (born 1959), British Labour Party politician and MP
Kevin Brennan (comedian) (born 1960), American comedian